Bapparaj (born 11 March 1963) is an actor, director and producer in the film industry of Bangladesh. He is better known for his roles of tragic roles in romantic relationships. He is the son of Bengali cinema actor Nayak Raj Razzak. He has acted in more than 100 films and he is now busy with family business.

Early life
Bapparaj was born as Rezaul Karim on 11 March to Bangladeshi actor Abdur Razzak and Khayerun Nesa (Laxmi).

Career
Bangladeshi film actor Bapparaj has acted in more than 100 films, with actresses such as Shabnur, Moushumi, Shabnaz, Lima, Sonia, Apu Biswas, and Purnima, and alongside other actors such as Riaz, Amit Hasan, Ferdous, Shakib Khan and Omar Sunny.

Filmography
{| class="wikitable" style="font-size: 95%;"
! Year !! Film !! Director !! Role !! Co-Artist !! Notes
|-
| 1986 || Chapadangar Bou || Nayak Raj Razzak || || || 
|-
| || Goriber Ostad || Jashim || || Shabana, Jashim, Alamgir ||
|-
| || Dakat || Delowar Jahan Zantu || || Jashim, Humayun Faridi ||
|-
| || Prem Geet || || || Omar Sani, Lima ||
|-
| 1996 || Ajker Sontrasi || Jibon Rahman|| || Manna || 
|-
| 1996 || Jinner Badshah || || || || 
|-
| || Amar Ontore Tumi || S M Sorker || || Shakil Khan, Shabnur ||
|-
| || Goriber Songshar || Delowar Jahan Zantu || || Shabana, Jashim, Dildar, Aruna Biswas ||
|-
| 1996 || Nirmom || || || ||
|-
| || Premer Somadhi || || || Amit Hasan, Shabnaz ||
|-
| || Pagleer Prem || Abid Hasan Badol || || Shabnur, Amit Hasan ||
|-
| || Tejjyo Putro || Saiful Ajam Kashem || || Moushumi, Omor Sani ||
|-
| 1997 || Baba Keno Chakor || || || Razzak, Mithun || 
|-
| || Santan Jokhon Shatru || || || Razzak ||
|-
| || Ma Jhokhon Bicharok || Sohanur Rohoman Sohan || || Popy, Alamgir, Shabana ||
|-
| || Judge Barri || Kaktarua || || || 
|-
| || Protishruti || Nur Mohammad Monir || || Shabnaj ||
|-
| 2000 || Sot Bhai || || || Sreelekha Mitra ||
|-
| 2001 || Jabab Chai || || || Sreelekha Mitra ||
|-
| 2002 || Bhalobasa Kare Koy || || || Riaz, Shabnur ||
|-
| 2009 || hridoy theke powa || Delwar Jahan Jhonto || || Manna, Mowsumi, Champa ||
|-
| 2009 || Sobaito Bhalobasha Chay || Delwar Jahan Jhantu || || Purnima, Emon ||
|-
| 2009 || O Sathi Re || Shafi Uddin Shafi || || Shakib Khan, Apu Biswas ||
|-
| 2011 || Maa Amar Chokher Moni || Mustafizur Rahman Manik || || Shabnur, Nirab, Rajani, Samrat, Rumana  ||
|-
| 2012 || Most Welcome || Anonno Mamun || || Sohel Rana, Ananta Jalil, Barsha ||
|-
| 2013 || Nishpap Munna || Bodiul Alam Khokon || || Shakib Khan, Sahara||
|-
| 2015 || Kartooz || Bapparaj || || Samrat, Nipun, Sohan Khan, Farzana Rikta || directorial debut
|-
| 2017 || Missed Call || Shafi Uddin Shafi || || Bappy Chowdhury, Mugdhata || 
|-
|2018 || PoraMon 2|| Raihan Rafi || || Siam Ahmed, Puja Cherry Roy ||
|}

Director

Bapparaj has assisted in direction on several dramas, including Kacher Manush, Rater Manush and Ekjon Lekhok. He directed the feature film Kartooz. He also produced the film Kache eshe valobeshe''.

See also
 Cinema of Bangladesh

References

External links
 

Living people
Bangladeshi male film actors
Bangladeshi male television actors
1963 births